The 2013–14 VELUX EHF Champions League was the 54th edition of Europe's premier club handball tournament and the 21st edition under the current EHF Champions League format. HSV Hamburg was the defending champion. The VELUX EHF FINAL4 was played on 31 May–1 June at the Lanxess Arena in Cologne, Germany.

SG Flensburg-Handewitt won the title for the first time after defeating THW Kiel 30–28 in the final.

Overview

Team allocation
The labels in the parentheses show how each team qualified for the place of its starting round:
TH: Title holders
CW: Cup winners
CR: Cup runners-up
2nd, 3rd, 4th, 5th, 6th, etc.: League position

Qualification stage

Qualification tournaments
Fourteen teams took part in the qualification tournaments. Twelve were drawn into three groups of four teams, where they played a semifinal and a final or third place match, while the remaining two teams played a two-legged playoff match. The winners of the qualification tournaments and of the play-off qualified for the group stage, while the eliminated teams were transferred to the 2013–14 EHF Cup. The draw took place on 27 June 2013, at 14:00 local time, in Vienna, Austria. Matches were played on 31 August and 1 September 2013.

Seedings

Qualification tournament 1
This qualification tournament was hosted in Presov, Slovakia, at the home venue of Tatran Prešov.

Qualification tournament 2
This qualification tournament was hosted in Novi Sad, Serbia, at the home venue of Vojvodina.

Qualification tournament 3
This qualification tournament was hosted in Porto, Portugal, at the home venue of Porto.

Playoff
The winner qualified for the group stage and the losing team entered the 2013–14 EHF Cup second round.

|}

Wildcard qualification
The winners qualified for the group stage and the losing teams entered the 2013–14 EHF Cup third round.

|}

Group phase

The draw for the group stage took place at the Gloriette in Vienna on 28 June 2013 at 20:15 local time. A total of 24 teams were drawn into four groups of six. Teams were divided into six pots, based on EHF coefficients. Clubs from the same pot or the same association could not be drawn into the same group, except the wild card tournament winner, which did not enjoy any protection.

Group A

Group B

Group C

Group D

Knockout stage

Last 16
The draw was held on 25 February 2014 at 12:00 in Vienna, Austria. The first legs were played on 20–23 March, and the second legs on 29–31 March 2014.

Seedings

Matches

|}

Quarter-finals
The draw was held on 1 April 2014 at 12:15 in Vienna, Austria. The first legs were played on 19–21 April, and the second legs on 26–27 April 2014.

Seedings

Matches

|}

Final four
The draw was held on 29 April 2014.

Awards

The All-star team of the Champions League 2013/14

See also
2013–14 EHF Cup

References

External links
Official website

 
Champions League
Champions League
EHF Champions League seasons